The Board of Technical Education, Delhi (BTEDELHI or DELHIBTE) is the board which provides technical education to students in Delhi, India after completing their Junior Engineers Course. The course is a three-year programme also called the three year diploma. Students must have completed high school.

BTEDELHI is mostly affiliated with government colleges and a few private colleges. There are over 30 trades offered in Group A including computer science, IT, mechanical, electrical, electronics, automobile, civil and tool and die engineering. There are more than 20 colleges affiliated with BTEDELHI that offer courses in Group A.

Other groups offer programmes in textiles, home science, agriculture, and others.

Organization
DELHI BTE has three type of institutions:

  Government Institutions
 Aryabhatt Institute of Technology
 Rao Tula Ram College of Technical Education
 Pusa Institute of Technology
 Ambedkar Polytechnic
 Delhi Institute of Tool Engineering (DITE) 
 G.B. Pant Institute of Technology
 Guru Nanak Dev Institute of Technology
 Kasturba Institute of Technology, Kasturba Polytechnic for Women was founded in 1986 and is affiliated to AICTE, Govt of India.
 Meerabai Institute of Technology
 Institute of Basic Business Studies, Pusa
 ITI Mangolpuri, Delhi
 World Class Skill Centre, Delhi
 ITI Khichripur, Mayur Vihar, Delhi
 ITI Nand Nagri, Delhi
 ITI Pusa, Delhi
 ITI Sir C.V. Raman, Dheerpur, Delhi
 ITI (W), Mori Gate Gokhle Road, Delhi
 ITI Malviya Nagar, Delhi
 ITI Jaffarpur, Delhi
 ITI for Women Vivek Vihar, Delhi
 ITI Veer Savarkar Basic Training Centre Pusa, Delhi
 ITI Lala Hans Raj Gupta, Delhi
 ITI Tilak Nagar, New Delhi
 ITI Siri Fort (W) New Delhi
 ITI Jail Road Hari Nagar, Delhi
 ITI Jahangirpuri
 ITI Arab Ki Sarai Nizamuddin, Delhi
 ITI Shahdara
  Aided Institutions 
  Private Institutions

References

Education in Delhi